The Orange County Sheriff's Office is the chief law enforcement agency for Orange County, Florida. The office is large with a budget of more than $300 million and over 2,700 sworn and civilian employees. The current sheriff, John Mina, was elected in a 2018 special election, and is the chief law enforcement officer of Orange County responsible for the safety of over one million  residents and the more than 72 million tourists that visit Orange County each year.

History
The first sheriff of Orange County dates from the earliest days of Florida's statehood in 1845. On January 31, 1845, the area known as Mosquito County in Territorial Florida was renamed Orange County, a name reflective of the spreading blanket of orange groves throughout the region. Less than six weeks later, on March 3, 1845, Florida's status as a territory was changed to that of statehood. The first statewide election was conducted on May 26, 1845. William Henry Williams was elected to serve as Orange County's first sheriff.

Since 1845, numerous prominent individuals have held the position of the Orange County Sheriff, including David William Mizell. Mizell was the only sheriff killed in the line of duty. There have been numerous theories and tales regarding the story which led to his demise, ranging from the local tradition of the Barber–Mizell feud to Reconstruction politics to a lawman simply attempting to do his additional duty of levying fines and collecting taxes.

In 2000, during a hostage standoff in Orlando, a SWAT team sniper accidentally shot a hostage instead of the hostage-taker. The city and the OCSO settled with the hostage's family for $3.9 million dollars, with OCSO paying $1.9 million.

In 2004, state senator Gary Siplin stated that the OCSO routinely used deadly force against unarmed African Americans.

Together with the Orlando Police Department, the OCSO responded to the 2016 Orlando nightclub shooting.

Deaths
Since 1870, one Sheriff, 17 Deputy Sheriffs, and one Corrections Officer have died in the line of duty.

1. Sheriff David W. L. Mizell
EOW: Monday, February 21, 1870
Cause: Gunfire

2. Deputy Sheriff Bobby L. Corley, Sr.
EOW: Sunday, August 8, 1965
Cause: Vehicular assault

3. Deputy Sheriff Samuel Parker, Jr.
EOW: Thursday, January 23, 1975
Cause: Motorcycle accident

4. Deputy Sheriff Arnold William Wilkerson
EOW: Tuesday, January 10, 1984
Cause: Gunfire

5. Deputy Sheriff Frank Nelson Seton
EOW: Wednesday, January 4, 1989
Cause: Fall

6. Deputy Sheriff Thomas Allen Ingram
EOW: Saturday, May 12, 1990
Cause: Vehicular assault

7. Deputy Sheriff Harry Jordan Dalton, Jr.
EOW: Monday, March 25, 1991
Cause: Gunfire

8.Deputy Sheriff John Joseph Creegan
EOW: Wednesday, May 29, 1996
Cause: Vehicular assault

9. Deputy Sheriff Grady Terrill Braddock
EOW: Wednesday, May 27, 1998
Cause: Vehicular assault

10. Deputy Sheriff John Harold Hollomon
EOW: Tuesday, December 15, 1998
Cause: Automobile accident

11. Deputy Sheriff James Marcus "Jimmy" Weaver
EOW: Monday, November 24, 2003
Cause: Struck by vehicle

12. Deputy Sheriff Mariano "Rocky" Lemus, Jr.
EOW: Friday, May 6, 2005
Cause: Duty related illness

13. Deputy Sheriff Michael Anthony Callin
EOW: Wednesday, August 2, 2006
Cause: Vehicular assault

14. Corrections Officer Mark Lindsey Parker
EOW: Thursday, March 19, 2009
Cause: Gunfire

15. Master Deputy Craig A. Heber
EOW: Wednesday, July 21, 2010
Cause: Heart attack

16. Deputy First Class Brandon Lee Coates
EOW: Wednesday, December 8, 2010
Cause: Gunfire

17. Detective Michael K. Erickson
EOW: Wednesday, March 16, 2011
Cause: Heart attack

18. Deputy Sheriff Jonathan Scott Pine
EOW: Tuesday, February 11, 2014
Cause: Gunfire

19. Deputy First Class Norman Lewis
EOW: Monday, January 9, 2017
Cause: Traffic Accident

Notable people
Sandy Adams, investigator, later member of the Florida House of Representatives (2002–2010) and US House (2011–2013)
Kevin Beary, sheriff (1993–2009)
Jerry Demings, sheriff (2009–2018)
John W. Mina, sheriff (2019–present)

See also

List of U.S. state and local law enforcement agencies
County sheriff (Florida)

Notes

External links
Orange County Sheriff's Office
 

Orange County, Florida
Sheriffs' departments of Florida
1845 establishments in Florida